Islandeady Lough is a freshwater lake in the west of Ireland. It is located in County Mayo.

Geography

Hydrology and natural history
Islandeady Lough drains to neighbouring Castlebar Lough via the Castlebar River. The river in turn flows through Lough Lannagh before passing through Castlebar. Islandeady Lough is stocked annually with brown trout.

See also
List of loughs in Ireland

References

Islandeady